Nicholas "Nick" Rogers (born May 2, 1975) is a retired American long-distance runner.

He competed in the 5000 metres at the 2000 Summer Olympics and the 2001 World Championships without reaching the final. He competed three times at the World Cross Country Championships, in 2000, 2001 and 2003. In 2001 he won a bronze medal in the team competition.

His personal best times were 7:56.65 minutes in the 3000 metres, achieved in July 2001 in London; 13:18.50 minutes in the 5000 metres, achieved in August 2000 in Heusden-Zolder; and 27:55.17 minutes in the 10,000 metres, achieved in May 2000 in Palo Alto.

Rogers was born in Seattle, Washington.

References

External links

1975 births
Living people
American male long-distance runners
Olympic track and field athletes of the United States
Athletes (track and field) at the 2000 Summer Olympics
World Athletics Championships athletes for the United States
Track and field athletes from Seattle